The Communist Party of Bohemia and Moravia (KSČM) held a leadership election on 1 October 2005. It was held following the resignation of the incumbent leader Miroslav Grebeníček. Vojtěch Filip defeated Václav Exner and became the new leader of KSČM. Filip was considered the candidate who is more similar to Grebeníček.

References

Communist Party of Bohemia and Moravia leadership elections
Communist Party of Bohemia and Moravia leadership election
Indirect elections
Communist Party of Bohemia and Moravia leadership election
Communist Party of Bohemia and Moravia leadership election